Joseph Roye Applegate (December 4, 1925 – October 18, 2003) was the first black faculty member at the Massachusetts Institute of Technology. He was a linguistics expert who started working at MIT in 1955 and worked on machine translation. In the 1960s he started working at Howard University and became a professor emeritus of African Studies and it was there that he started the nation's first Ph.D. program in African Studies.

Early life and family
Joseph Applegate was born in Wildwood, New Jersey. His parents operated a boarding house.

Career
Applegate received his master's and PhD in linguistics from the University of Pennsylvania, after which he began his career at MIT in the Research Laboratory of Electronics in 1955. At the Research Laboratory of Electronics he studied the mechanical translation of languages. In 1959 he became the director of MIT's new language laboratory. At MIT he taught linguistics with such peers as Noam Chomsky and Morris Halle. He left MIT and worked at the University of California in Los Angeles from 1960 to 1966. In 1966 he started working at Howard University and became a professor of African studies in 1969. He was the director of the African Studies and Research Program from 1967 to 1969.

References

1925 births
2003 deaths
Temple University alumni
People from Wildwood, New Jersey
Linguists from the United States